
Wolf-Günther Trierenberg (18 June 1891  – 25 July 1981) was a German general during World War II who commanded several divisions. He was also a recipient of the Knight's Cross of the Iron Cross of Nazi Germany. In February–March 1945 he commanded the 347th Infantry Division in the defense of Saarbrücken.

Awards and decorations

 Knight's Cross of the Iron Cross on 10 May 1943 as Generalleutnant and commander of 167th Infantry Division

References

Citations

Bibliography

 

1891 births
1981 deaths
Lieutenant generals of the German Army (Wehrmacht)
German Army personnel of World War I
Recipients of the clasp to the Iron Cross, 1st class
Recipients of the Gold German Cross
Recipients of the Knight's Cross of the Iron Cross
German prisoners of war in World War II held by the United States
People from Forst (Lausitz)
People from the Province of Brandenburg
Military personnel from Brandenburg
German Army generals of World War II